The 2009–10 Campionato Sammarinese di Calcio season was the twenty-fifth since its establishment. The season began in September 2009 and ended with the playoff final in May 2010. Tre Fiori were the defending league champions, having won their fifth Sammarinese championship the previous season.

Participating teams

Because there was no promotion or relegation, the same 15 teams that competed in the previous season competed again.
 S.P. Cailungo (Borgo Maggiore)
 S.S. Cosmos (Serravalle)
 F.C. Domagnano (Domagnano)
 S.C. Faetano (Faetano)
 S.S. Folgore Falciano Calcio (Serravalle)
 F.C. Fiorentino (Fiorentino)
 A.C. Juvenes/Dogana (Serravalle)
 S.S. Pennarossa (Chiesanuova)
 S.P. La Fiorita (Montegiardino)
 A.C. Libertas (Borgo Maggiore)
 S.S. Murata (San Marino)
 S.S. San Giovanni (Borgo Maggiore)
 S.P. Tre Fiori (Fiorentino)
 S.P. Tre Penne (Serravalle)
 S.S. Virtus (Acquaviva)

Venues
The teams did not have grounds of their own due to restricted space in San Marino. Each match was randomly assigned to one of the following grounds:
 Stadio Olimpico (Serravalle)
 Campo di Fiorentino (Fiorentino)
 Campo di Acquaviva (Chiesanuova)
 Campo di Dogana (Serravalle)
 Campo Fonte dell'Ovo (Domagnano)
 Campo di Serravalle "B" (Serravalle)

Regular season

Group A

Group B

Results
All teams played twice against teams within their own group and once against teams from the other group. This meant that the clubs in the eight-club group played 21 matches each while the clubs in the seven-club group played 20 matches each during the regular season.

Play-off
The playoff were held in a double-elimination format. Both group winners earned byes in the first and second round.

First round
These matches took place on 3 and 4 May 2010.

Second round
The matches were played on 7 and 8 May 2009. Juvenes/Dogana were eliminated.

Third round
The group winners enter the playoff in this round. These matches took place on 11 and 13 May 2010. Domagnano were eliminated.

Fourth round
These matches were played on 17 and 21 May 2010. Cosmos were eliminated.

Semifinal
This match took place on 25 May 2010. As the Final featured both 2009–10 Coppa Titano finalists, Faetano qualified for the first qualifying round of the 2010–11 UEFA Europa League.

Final
The final took place on 31 May 2010. The winner qualified for the first qualifying round of the 2010–11 UEFA Champions League, while the runner-up qualified for the second qualifying round of the 2010–11 UEFA Europa League.

References 

Campionato Sammarinese di Calcio
San Marino
1